This is a list of parliamentary by-elections in Great Britain held between 1754 and 1774, with the names of the previous incumbent and the victor in the by-election.

In the absence of a comprehensive and reliable source for party and factional alignments in this period, no attempt is made to define them in this article. The House of Commons: 1754–1790 provides some guidance on the complex and shifting political relationships, but it is significant that the compilers of that work make no attempt to produce a definitive list of each member's allegiances.

Resignations
See Resignation from the British House of Commons for more details.

Where the cause of the by-election is given as "resignation", this indicates that the incumbent was appointed at his own request to an "office of profit under the Crown". Offices used in this period were the Stewards of the Chiltern Hundreds, the Manor of Old Shoreham, the Manor of East Hendred, the Manor of Kennington in Surrey (used once in 1757) and the Manor of Shippon in Berkshire (used once in 1765).  These appointments are used as a constitutional device for leaving the House of Commons, whose Members are not permitted to resign. If the vacancy was caused by appointment to another office then this office is noted in brackets.

In addition certain offices of profit, such as cabinet positions, required the MP to seek re-election. These offices are noted separately.

By-elections
The c/u column denotes whether the by-election was a contested poll or an unopposed return. If the winner was re-elected, at the next general election and any intermediate by-elections, this is indicated by an * following the c or u. In a few cases the winner was elected at the next general election but had not been re-elected in a by-election after the one noted. In those cases no * symbol is used.

11th Parliament  (1754–1761)

12th Parliament  (1761–1768)

13th Parliament  (1768–1774)

References

 
 Return of the name of every member of the lower house of parliament of England, Scotland, and Ireland, with name of constituency represented, and date of return, from 1213 to 1874.
 The House of Commons 1754–1790, edited by Namier, Lewis Bernstein, Sir (London : Published for the History of Parliament Trust by H.M. Stationery Office, 1964)

External links
 History of Parliament: Members 1754–1790
 History of Parliament: Constituencies 1754–1790

By-elections to the Parliament of Great Britain
18th century in Great Britain